Jim Miller (born August 30, 1983) is an American mixed martial artist, who currently competes in the UFC lightweight division. He currently holds the record of most bouts in UFC history, most wins in UFC history and most wins in the UFC lightweight division. He is also the younger brother of former UFC fighter Dan Miller.

Early life
Born and raised in Sparta Township, New Jersey and the youngest of three brothers, Miller started wrestling at the age of four. He competed in wrestling in high school at Sparta High School, as well as one year of collegiate wrestling at Virginia Tech. Miller had not originally planned on wrestling at Virginia Tech, but his desire to compete again grew and he made the team as a walk-on later into the season. However, Miller did not continue competing for the school because of "disagreements" with the coaching staff and the program. He currently holds a black belt in Brazilian jiu-jitsu under Jamie Cruz. Miller began training in mixed martial arts in 2005 when he began training at Planet Jiu-Jitsu in Sparta, New Jersey with his brother Dan Miller.

Mixed martial arts career

Early career
Miller had his first professional fight on November 19, 2005, against Eddie Fyvie at Reality Fighting 10. Miller controlled the fight and earned a unanimous decision. Miller earned two more victories in the promotion over Kevin Roddy and Joe Andujar, both via the first-round submission. The quick victories earned Miller a title shot and he fought Muhsin Corbbrey for the Reality Fighting Lightweight Championship. Miller mounted Corrbrey in the second round and battered his opponent before securing an armbar for the victory. In his first title defense, Miller took on future UFC Lightweight Champion Frankie Edgar at Reality Fighting 14. Edgar controlled the fight, but Miller secured a tight guillotine late in the final round. Edgar fought through the choke to earn the unanimous decision.

In the weeks prior to Reality Fighting 14, Planet Jiu-Jitsu closed down. Miller began training at AMA Fight Club in Whippany, New Jersey with his brother Dan in January 2007.

Miller debuted with the Cage Fury Fighting Championships in a Lightweight Championship bout on April 13, 2007, against Evo Fight Club's Al Buck. Jim fought on the same card as his brother for the first time since Reality Fighting XII and both were victorious. Miller and Buck squared off but were forced to separate early after an accidental knee to Buck's groin. When the fight resumed, Miller began working for a takedown and after escaping an attempted guillotine, secured a slam, from which he quickly attained the mount and then the back, sinking in a rear-naked choke for the win.

Miller defended his title for the first time at Cage Fury Fighting Championships 5 against Atlantic City MMA's Anthony Morrison. Morrison delivered some big slams early, but Miller worked through a chain of submissions before securing the victory by triangle choke at 4:56 of the first round to retain his title.

Miller's second defense was scheduled for the Cage Fury Fighting Championships 6 card, where he was to face King of the Cage Champion Clay French, but the event was canceled a week prior to the event when a primary investor dropped out.

Ultimate Fighting Championship

2008
Jim and his brother Dan signed with the UFC in July 2008. Miller made his debut at UFC 89 where he defeated David Baron in the third round. This win earned Miller his first Submission of the Night bonus award.

Miller next acted as a late replacement for Frankie Edgar against Matt Wiman at UFC: Fight for the Troops. Miller dominated Wiman for three rounds, winning via unanimous decision (30-27, 30–27, 30–26). The fight also earned both fighters the Fight of the Night bonus award.

2009

Miller next faced Gray Maynard on March 7, 2009, at UFC 96. He lost the fight via unanimous decision.

Miller next faced The Ultimate Fighter winner Mac Danzig on July 11, 2009, at UFC 100, and won in a one-sided unanimous decision.

Miller was scheduled to face Thiago Tavares on September 19, 2009, at UFC 103, but Tavares was forced to drop out due to a knee injury suffered while training. UFC newcomer Steve Lopez stepped in to replace Tavares. Both fighters exchanged competitively on the feet, but Miller won after Lopez injured his shoulder in round two.

2010

Miller was expected to face Tyson Griffin on January 2, 2010, at UFC 108, but an injury forced Griffin off the card. Sean Sherk agreed to step up from the undercard and fight Miller, rather than his original opponent in Rafaello Oliveira. However, Sherk pulled out of the fight because of a cut that required many stitches; returning veteran Duane Ludwig was named as Sherk's replacement. Miller looked comfortable and sharp on his feet exchanging with the seasoned striker in Ludwig and scored a knockdown halfway through the round with a fast combination. Miller swarmed to secure an armbar, winning by submission at 2:31 of the first round.

Miller faced Mark Bocek on March 27, 2010, at UFC 111. After three closely contested rounds, Miller was awarded the unanimous decision win.

Miller fought Gleison Tibau at UFC Fight Night 22 winning via unanimous decision. Miller was able to use his improved footwork to outstrike Tibau and stuff most of his takedowns.

Miller faced touted prospect Charles Oliveira on December 11, 2010, at UFC 124. Miller defeated Oliveira via a first round kneebar to extend his winning streak to six and earning the Submission of the Night bonus.

2011

Miller defeated WEC import, Kamal Shalorus on March 19, 2011, at UFC 128. Miller won the fight via TKO in the third round, after landing an uppercut and knee to Shalorus's face.

Miller faced Benson Henderson on August 14, 2011, at UFC on Versus 5.  He lost the fight via unanimous decision (30-27, 29–28, 30–26). He later revealed that he was battling kidney infection and mononucleosis when cutting weight for the fight.

2012

On January 20, 2012, he faced Melvin Guillard at UFC on FX 1. After being rocked early by a knee and punches from Guillard in the first round, Miller was able to get the fight to the ground and submit Guillard with a rear naked choke. This win earned Miller his third Submission of the Night bonus award.

Miller next faced Nate Diaz on May 5, 2012, in the main event on UFC on Fox: Diaz vs. Miller. He lost the fight via submission, for the first time in his professional career, in the second round due to a guillotine choke.

Miller faced Joe Lauzon on December 29, 2012, at UFC 155, replacing an injured Gray Maynard. He won the fight via unanimous decision, with the performance earning both participants Fight of the Night honors. The win also gave Miller the most all-time wins in UFC lightweight history.

2013

Miller faced Pat Healy on April 27, 2013, at UFC 159. He lost the back-and-forth fight by submission in the third round. Despite the loss, the bout earned Miller his third - and second consecutive - Fight of the Night bonus. Healy, however, subsequently tested positive for marijuana and the result of the fight was overturned to a No Contest.

Miller faced Fabrício Camões at UFC 168 in on December 28, 2013. The two were originally scheduled to meet in 2008 at IFL 22 but the bout was scrapped after Camões was forced to withdraw due to injury. Miller locked in an armbar for the submission victory at 3:42 of the first round.

2014

Miller was expected to face Bobby Green on April 26, 2014, at UFC 172.  However, in the week leading up to the event, Green pulled out of the bout citing an injury and was replaced by Yancy Medeiros. Miller won the fight via submission in the first round.

Miller faced Donald Cerrone on July 16, 2014, at UFC Fight Night 45.  After a back and forth first round, Miller was defeated via second-round knockout.

2015

Miller was expected to face Paul Felder on April 18, 2015, at UFC on Fox 15.  However, Felder was forced to pull out of the event due to a knee injury and was replaced by Beneil Dariush. Miller lost the fight by unanimous decision.

Miller faced Danny Castillo on July 25, 2015, at UFC on Fox 16, replacing Rustam Khabilov who was pulled from the card with alleged visa issues. He won the fight by split decision.

Miller faced Michael Chiesa on December 10, 2015, at UFC Fight Night 80.  He lost the bout via submission in the second round.  Despite the loss, Miller was awarded his fourth Fight of the Night bonus award.

2016

Miller faced Diego Sanchez on March 5, 2016, at UFC 196. He lost the fight by unanimous decision.

Miller next faced former Pride FC Lightweight Champion Takanori Gomi on July 9, 2016, at UFC 200. He won the fight via TKO in the first round.

After sustaining virtually no damage during his previous fight, Miller was quickly rescheduled to rematch Joe Lauzon on August 27, 2016, at UFC on Fox 21. He won the back-and-forth fight via split decision. The win also earned Miller his fifth Fight of the Night bonus award.

Miller next faced Thiago Alves on November 12, 2016, at UFC 205. At the weigh-ins, Alves missed weight by six pounds, weighing in at 162.6 lbs. Miller, who was already on weight, had to rehydrate to keep their weight difference within 7 pounds. Because of that, he came in at 157.6 lbs and the bout proceeded at catchweight. New York State Athletic Commission and UFC officials indicated that Alves must not weigh more than 173 lbs the day of the fight or the fight would be canceled. As a result, Alves was fined 20% of his fight purse, which went to Miller. He won the fight by unanimous decision.

2017

Miller faced Dustin Poirier on February 11, 2017, at UFC 208. He lost the back-and-forth fight by majority decision. Both participants earned Fight of the Night honors.

Miller faced Anthony Pettis on July 8, 2017, at UFC 213. He lost the fight by unanimous decision.

Miller faced Francisco Trinaldo on October 28, 2017, at UFC Fight Night 119.  He lost the fight by unanimous decision.

2018

Miller faced Dan Hooker on April 21, 2018, at UFC Fight Night 128. He lost the fight via knockout in the first round.

Miller faced Alex White on September 8, 2018, at UFC 228. He won the fight via submission in the first round. Miller locked in a rear-naked choke after dropping White with punches. In this bout, Miller subsequently became the first UFC fighter to both reach 30 fights in the organization and win 17 fights in its Lightweight division.

Miller faced Charles Oliveira in a rematch on December 15, 2018, at UFC on Fox 31. He lost the fight via a rear-naked choke submission early in the first round.

2019

Miller faced Jason Gonzalez on April 27, 2019, at UFC Fight Night: Jacaré vs. Hermansson. He won the fight via a rear-naked choke submission in the first round. The win also earned Miller his first Performance of the Night bonus award.

Miller faced Clay Guida on August 3, 2019, at UFC on ESPN 5. He won the fight via a technical submission due to a guillotine choke in the first minute of the first round.

2020
Miller faced Scott Holtzman on February 15, 2020, at UFC Fight Night 167. He lost the back-and-forth fight by unanimous decision. The bout also earned Miller his seventh Fight of the Night bonus award.

Miller faced to Roosevelt Roberts on June 20, 2020, at UFC Fight Night: Blaydes vs. Volkov. He won the fight via verbal submission due to an armbar at 2:25 of the first round. This win earned him the Performance of the Night award.

Miller faced Vinc Pichel at UFC 252 on August 15, 2020. He lost the fight by unanimous decision.

2021
Miller was expected to face Bobby Green on February 13, 2021, at UFC 258. However the fight was cancelled when Green collapsed after the weigh-ins.

Miller faced Joe Solecki on April 10, 2021, at UFC on ABC 2. He lost the fight by unanimous decision.

Miller was scheduled to face Nikolas Motta on September 18, 2021, at UFC Fight Night 192. However, a week before the event, Miller tested positive for COVID-19 and was pulled from the event. This marked the first time Miller pulled out of a fight in his then 49-fight career.

Miller faced Erick Gonzalez on October 16, 2021 UFC Fight Night 195. He won the fight via knockout early in round two. This win earned him the Performance of the Night award.

2022
The bout between Miller and Nikolas Motta eventually took place at UFC Fight Night 201 on February 19, 2022. Miller won the fight via TKO in the second round. With this win, Miller tied Donald Cerrone for the most wins in UFC history with twenty-three (23).

Miller was rebooked to face Bobby Green for the third time on July 2, 2022, at UFC 276. A week before the event, Green was forced to pull out of the bout and Miller was instead booked at welterweight in a rematch against Donald Cerrone. Miller won the fight in the second round after submitting Cerrone with a guillotine choke. With this win Miller set the record for the most wins in UFC history.

2023 
Miller was scheduled to face Gabriel Benítez on February 18, 2023, at UFC Fight Night 219.  However, Benítez withdrew due to an undisclosed reason and was replaced by Alexander Hernandez. He lost the fight via unanimous decision.

Personal life
Jim was married in 2008. The couple has four children, with their first child born in June 2010. Prior to their careers in mixed martial arts, Jim and his brother Dan worked in construction with their father. Since Spring 2013, Miller has been suffering from Lyme disease, which doctors were slow to diagnose. However, since his diagnosis, Miller has been able to alleviate the symptoms of the disease by changing his nutrition plan.

Championships and accomplishments

Mixed martial arts
Ultimate Fighting Championship
Most wins in UFC history (24)
Most bouts in UFC history (41)
Most bouts in UFC Lightweight division history (38)
Most wins in UFC Lightweight division history (21)
Second most finishes in UFC history (16) (tied with Donald Cerrone)
Most finishes in UFC Lightweight division history (14)
Second most submission wins in UFC history (11) (tied with Demian Maia)
Second most submission wins in UFC Lightweight division history (9)
Fight of the Night (Seven times) 
Performance of the Night (Three times) 
Submission of the Night (Three times) 
Fight of the Year (2012) 
Most fight time in UFC Lightweight division history (6:18:59)
Fifth most total fight time in UFC history (6:42:56)
Most submission attempts in UFC history (47)
 Tied (Dustin Poirier) for sixth most post-fight night bonuses in UFC history (13)
 Tied (Joe Lauzon, Diego Sanchez and Justin Gaethje) for fifth most Fight of the Night bonuses in UFC history (7)
 Most decision bouts in UFC Lightweight division history (18)
 Third most decision bouts in UFC history (19)
United States Kickboxing Association
USKBA Welterweight Championship
Cage Fury Fighting Championships
Cage Fury Fighting Championships Lightweight Championship (one time; former)
One successful title defense
MMAJunkie.com
2019 April Submission of the Month vs. Jason Gonzalez
2019 August Submission of the Month vs. Clay Guida
Reality Fighting
Reality Fighting Lightweight Championship (one time; former)
Reality Fighting Featherweight Championship (one time; former)
Sherdog
2012 All-Violence First Team

Mixed martial arts record 

|-
|Loss
|align=center|35–17 (1)
|Alexander Hernandez
|Decision (unanimous)
|UFC Fight Night: Andrade vs. Blanchfield
|
|align=center|3
|align=center|5:00
|Las Vegas, Nevada, United States
|
|-
|Win
|align=center|35–16 (1)
|Donald Cerrone
|Submission (guillotine choke)
|UFC 276
| 
|align=center|2
|align=center|1:32
|Las Vegas, Nevada, United States
| 
|-
|Win
|align=center|34–16 (1)
|Nikolas Motta
|TKO (punches)
|UFC Fight Night: Walker vs. Hill
|
|align=center|2
|align=center|1:58
|Las Vegas, Nevada, United States
|
|-
|Win
|align=center|33–16 (1)
|Erick Gonzalez
|KO (punch)
|UFC Fight Night: Ladd vs. Dumont 
|
|align=center|2
|align=center|0:14
|Las Vegas, Nevada, United States
|
|-
|Loss
|align=center|32–16 (1)
|Joe Solecki
|Decision (unanimous)
|UFC on ABC: Vettori vs. Holland
|
|align=center|3
|align=center|5:00
|Las Vegas, Nevada, United States
|
|-
|Loss
|align=center|32–15 (1)
|Vinc Pichel
|Decision (unanimous)
|UFC 252 
|
|align=center|3
|align=center|5:00
|Las Vegas, Nevada, United States
|
|-
|Win
|align=center|32–14 (1)
|Roosevelt Roberts
|Submission (armbar)
|UFC on ESPN: Blaydes vs. Volkov 
|
|align=center|1
|align=center|2:25
|Las Vegas, Nevada, United States
|
|-
|Loss
|align=center|31–14 (1)
|Scott Holtzman
|Decision (unanimous)
|UFC Fight Night: Anderson vs. Błachowicz 2 
|
|align=center|3
|align=center|5:00
|Rio Rancho, New Mexico, United States
|
|-
|Win
|align=center|31–13 (1)
|Clay Guida
|Technical Submission (guillotine choke)
|UFC on ESPN: Covington vs. Lawler
|
|align=center|1
|align=center|0:58
|Newark, New Jersey, United States
|
|-
|Win
|align=center|30–13 (1)
|Jason Gonzalez
|Submission (rear-naked choke)
|UFC Fight Night: Jacaré vs. Hermansson 
|
|align=center|1
|align=center|2:12
|Sunrise, Florida, United States
|
|-
|Loss
|align=center|29–13 (1)
|Charles Oliveira
|Submission (rear-naked choke)
|UFC on Fox: Lee vs. Iaquinta 2
|
|align=center|1
|align=center|1:15
|Milwaukee, Wisconsin, United States
|
|-
|Win
|align=center|29–12 (1)
|Alex White
|Submission (rear-naked choke)
|UFC 228 
|
|align=center|1
|align=center|1:29
|Dallas, Texas, United States
|
|-  
|Loss
|align=center|28–12 (1)
|Dan Hooker
|KO (knee)
|UFC Fight Night: Barboza vs. Lee
|
|align=center|1
|align=center|3:00
|Atlantic City, New Jersey, United States
|
|-  
|Loss
|align=center|28–11 (1)
|Francisco Trinaldo
|Decision (unanimous)
|UFC Fight Night: Brunson vs. Machida
|
|align=center|3
|align=center|5:00
|São Paulo, Brazil
|
|-
|Loss
|align=center|28–10 (1)
|Anthony Pettis
|Decision (unanimous)
|UFC 213 
|
|align=center|3
|align=center|5:00
|Las Vegas, Nevada, United States
|
|-
|Loss
|align=center|28–9 (1)
|Dustin Poirier
|Decision (majority)
|UFC 208
|
|align=center|3
|align=center|5:00
|Brooklyn, New York, United States
|
|-
|Win
|align=center|28–8 (1)
|Thiago Alves
|Decision (unanimous)
|UFC 205
|
|align=center|3
|align=center|5:00
|New York City, New York, United States
|  
|-
|Win
|align=center|27–8 (1)
|Joe Lauzon
|Decision (split)
|UFC on Fox: Maia vs. Condit
|
|align=center|3
|align=center|5:00
|Vancouver, British Columbia, Canada
|
|-
|Win
|align=center|26–8 (1)
|Takanori Gomi
|TKO (punches)
|UFC 200
|
|align=center|1
|align=center|2:18
|Las Vegas, Nevada, United States
| 
|-
|Loss
|align=center|25–8 (1)
|Diego Sanchez
|Decision (unanimous)
|UFC 196
|
|align=center|3
|align=center|5:00
|Las Vegas, Nevada, United States
|
|-
|Loss
|align=center|25–7 (1)
|Michael Chiesa
|Submission (rear-naked choke)
|UFC Fight Night: Namajunas vs. VanZant
|
|align=center|2
|align=center|2:57
|Las Vegas, Nevada, United States
| 
|-
|Win
|align=center|25–6 (1)
|Danny Castillo
|Decision (split)
|UFC on Fox: Dillashaw vs. Barão 2
|
|align=center|3
|align=center|5:00
|Chicago, Illinois, United States
|
|-
|Loss
|align=center|24–6 (1)
|Beneil Dariush
|Decision (unanimous)
|UFC on Fox: Machida vs. Rockhold 
|
|align=center|3
|align=center|5:00
|Newark, New Jersey, United States
|
|-
|Loss
|align=center|24–5 (1)
|Donald Cerrone
|KO (head kick and punches)
|UFC Fight Night: Cowboy vs. Miller
|
|align=center| 2
|align=center| 3:31
|Atlantic City, New Jersey, United States
|
|-
|Win
|align=center|24–4 (1)
|Yancy Medeiros
|Technical Submission (guillotine choke)
|UFC 172
|
|align=center|1
|align=center|3:18
|Baltimore, Maryland, United States
|
|-
|Win
|align=center|23–4 (1)
|Fabrício Camões
|Submission (armbar)
|UFC 168
|
|align=center|1
|align=center|3:42
|Las Vegas, Nevada, United States
|
|-
|NC
|align=center|22–4 (1)
|Pat Healy
|NC (overturned)
|UFC 159
|
|align=center|3
|align=center|4:02
|Newark, New Jersey, United States
|
|-
|Win
|align=center|22–4
|Joe Lauzon
|Decision (unanimous)
|UFC 155
|
|align=center|3
|align=center|5:00
|Las Vegas, Nevada, United States
| 
|-
|Loss
|align=center|21–4
|Nate Diaz
|Submission (guillotine choke)
|UFC on Fox: Diaz vs. Miller
|
|align=center|2
|align=center|4:09
|East Rutherford, New Jersey, United States
|
|-
|Win
|align=center|21–3
|Melvin Guillard
|Submission (rear-naked choke)
|UFC on FX: Guillard vs. Miller
|
|align=center|1
|align=center|3:04
|Nashville, Tennessee, United States
|
|-
|Loss
|align=center|20–3
|Benson Henderson
|Decision (unanimous)
|UFC Live: Hardy vs. Lytle
|
|align=center|3
|align=center|5:00
|Milwaukee, Wisconsin, United States
|
|-
|Win
|align=center|20–2
|Kamal Shalorus
|TKO (knee and punches)
|UFC 128
|
|align=center|3
|align=center|2:15
|Newark, New Jersey, United States
|
|-
|Win
|align=center|19–2
|Charles Oliveira
|Submission (kneebar)
|UFC 124
|
|align=center|1
|align=center|1:59
|Montreal, Quebec, Canada
|
|-
|Win
|align=center|18–2
|Gleison Tibau
|Decision (unanimous)
|UFC Fight Night: Marquardt vs. Palhares
|
|align=center|3
|align=center|5:00
|Austin, Texas, United States
|
|-
|Win
|align=center|17–2
|Mark Bocek
|Decision (unanimous)
|UFC 111
|
|align=center|3
|align=center|5:00
|Newark, New Jersey, United States
|
|-
|Win
|align=center|16–2
|Duane Ludwig
|Submission (armbar)
|UFC 108
|
|align=center|1
|align=center|2:31
|Las Vegas, Nevada, United States
|
|-
|Win
|align=center|15–2
|Steve Lopez
|TKO (shoulder injury)
|UFC 103
|
|align=center|2
|align=center|0:48
|Dallas, Texas, United States
|
|-
|Win
|align=center|14–2
|Mac Danzig
|Decision (unanimous)
|UFC 100
|
|align=center|3
|align=center|5:00
|Las Vegas, Nevada, United States
|
|-
|Loss
|align=center|13–2
|Gray Maynard
|Decision (unanimous)
|UFC 96
|
|align=center|3
|align=center|5:00
|Columbus, Ohio, United States
|
|-
|Win
|align=center|13–1
|Matt Wiman
|Decision (unanimous)
|UFC: Fight for the Troops
|
|align=center|3
|align=center|5:00
|Fayetteville, North Carolina, United States
|
|-
|Win
|align=center|12–1
|David Baron
|Submission (rear-naked choke)
|UFC 89
|
|align=center|3
|align=center|3:19
|Birmingham, England
|
|-
|Win
|align=center|11–1
|Bart Palaszewski
|Decision (unanimous)
|IFL: New Jersey
|
|align=center|3
|align=center|5:00
|East Rutherford, New Jersey, United States
|
|-
|Win
|align=center|10–1
|Chris Liguori
|Submission (guillotine choke)
|Ring of Combat 18
|
|align=center|2
|align=center|2:22
|Atlantic City, New Jersey, United States
|
|-
|Win
|align=center|9–1
|Chris Liguori
|TKO (doctor stoppage)
|Ring of Combat 17: Beast of the Northeast Finals 
|
|align=center|2
|align=center|5:00
|Atlantic City, New Jersey, United States
|
|-
|Win
|align=center|8–1
|Nuri Shakir
|Submission (rear-naked choke)
|Battle Cage Xtreme 3
|
|align=center|3
|align=center|2:17
|Atlantic City, New Jersey, United States
|
|-
|Win
|align=center|7–1
|Anthony Morrison
|Submission (triangle choke)
|CFFC 5: Two Worlds, One Cage
|
|align=center|1
|align=center|4:56
|Atlantic City, New Jersey, United States
|
|-
|Win
|align=center|6–1
|Al Buck
|Submission (rear-naked choke)
|Cage Fury Fighting Championships 4
|
|align=center|1
|align=center|1:58
|Atlantic City, New Jersey, United States
|
|-
|Loss
|align=center|5–1
|Frankie Edgar
|Decision (unanimous)
|Reality Fighting 14: Fall Brawl
|
|align=center|3
|align=center|5:00
|Atlantic City, New Jersey, United States
|
|-
|Win
|align=center|5–0
|James Jones
|Submission (triangle choke)
|Combat in the Cage: Marked Territory
|
|align=center|2
|align=center|1:55
|Lincroft, New Jersey, United States
|
|-
|Win
|align=center|4–0
|Muhsin Corbbrey
|Submission (armbar)
|RF 13: Battle at the Beach 2006
|
|align=center|2
|align=center|3:35
|Wildwood, New Jersey, United States
|
|-
|Win
|align=center|3–0
|Joseph Andujar
|Submission (arm-triangle choke)
|Reality Fighting 12: Return to Boardwalk Hall 
|
|align=center|1
|align=center|1:04
|Atlantic City, New Jersey, United States
|
|-
|Win
|align=center|2–0
|Kevin Roddy
|Submission (rear-naked choke)
|Reality Fighting 11: Battle at Taj Mahal 
|
|align=center|1
|align=center|1:31
|Atlantic City, New Jersey, United States
|
|-
|Win
|align=center|1–0
|Eddie Fyvie
|Decision (unanimous)
|Reality Fighting 10
|
|align=center|2
|align=center|5:00
|Atlantic City, New Jersey, United States
|

See also
 List of current UFC fighters
 List of male mixed martial artists

References

External links 

Living people
American male mixed martial artists
Lightweight mixed martial artists
Mixed martial artists utilizing collegiate wrestling
Mixed martial artists utilizing Muay Thai
Mixed martial artists utilizing Brazilian jiu-jitsu
1983 births
Mixed martial artists from New Jersey
People from Sparta, New Jersey
American practitioners of Brazilian jiu-jitsu
People awarded a black belt in Brazilian jiu-jitsu
American Muay Thai practitioners
American male sport wrestlers
Amateur wrestlers
Virginia Tech alumni
People from Hanover Township, New Jersey
Sportspeople from Sussex County, New Jersey
Ultimate Fighting Championship male fighters